The following is a list of FCC-licensed radio stations in the U.S. state of South Dakota, which can be sorted by their call signs, frequencies, cities of license, licensees, and programming formats.

List of radio stations

Defunct
 KABR

References

 
South Dakota